Gabby La La (born Gabriel Lang on May 23, 1979) is a vocalist and multi-instrumentalist (including sitar, ukulele, accordion, theremin and toy piano), signed to Prawn Song Records.  Her music is self described as "fun, unique, crazy (and) kooky".  La La's debut album, Be Careful What You Wish For..., is a collaboration with Les Claypool that though "peculiar... reveals gems of pop merriment."

Gabby La La is primarily a solo artist but, at times, she has been a member of Weapon of Choice, and she was a member of Les Claypool's Fancy Band.

Career
La La sings with a high pitched voice "like art singer Dagmar Krause on helium". She plays the electric guitar, ukulele, toy piano, sitar, theremin and accordion. She plays the sitar, which she is classically trained on, like she's playing a guitar. She also tap dances. She has been compared to Björk, Hello Kitty and Yoko Ono. Her live band occasionally consists of Les Claypool on bass. She generally wears brightly colored wigs when she performs. La La has been called Claypool's protégé and she performs in his Fancy Band. She has performed on The Tonight Show with Jay Leno with Snoop Dogg. La La has performed with Jane Wiedlin and The Coup. She has taught young girls how to play rock music through music classes at the Phoenix Theater. La La has been reviewed and featured in the SFist, Metroactive and The Aquarian Weekly. She has been a solo performer at Bonnaroo.

Personal life
La La was born in Petaluma, California. She has a sister, named Mimi. She has a child with Boots Riley.

Discography

Studio albums

As writer, arranger, and/or performer
 2004 The Big Eyeball in the Sky by Colonel Claypool's Bucket of Bernie Brains (CD; Prawn Song)
 2005 True & Livin' by Zion I (CD, 2×LP; LiveUp)
 2006 Of Whales and Woe by Les Claypool (CD, LP 180 gr.; Prawn Song)
 2007 Turn My Teeth Up! by Baby Elephant (CD; Godforsaken Music)

References

External links

 
 

American accordionists
Women accordionists
American multi-instrumentalists
American women singer-songwriters
Living people
Singer-songwriters from California
Sitar players
Theremin players
American ukulele players
People from Petaluma, California
Musicians from the San Francisco Bay Area
1979 births
Les Claypool's Fancy Band members
21st-century accordionists
21st-century American women musicians
21st-century American singers
21st-century American women singers